The 13th U-boat Flotilla (German 13. Unterseebootsflottille) was a World War II U-boat unit of Nazi Germany's Kriegsmarine stationed in Trondheim, Norway. The emblem of the unit was a cross with a Viking ship in the middle.

History 
In 1941, construction of the DORA 1 submarine base started in Trondheim. Two years later, in June 1943, it was handed over to the flotilla commander, Korvettenkapitän (later Fregattenkapitän) Rolf Rüggeberg. The 13th submarine flotilla was a front line unit, and a total of 55 Type VIIC and VIIC/41 served with it until the end of the war in May 1945.

Vessels

References 
 Uboat.net, 13. Flotilla

13
Military units and formations of the Kriegsmarine
Military units and formations established in 1943
Military units and formations disestablished in 1945